Eva Kerbler (born 1933) is an Austrian actress.

Selected filmography
  (1952)
 Cabaret (1954)
 Columbus Discovers Kraehwinkel (1954)
 Rosen für Bettina (1956)
 Santa Lucia (1956)
 And Who Is Kissing Me? (1956)

References

External links

1933 births
Living people
Actresses from Vienna
Austrian film actresses
Austrian television actresses